Matthieu Ory (1492 at Caulnes – 1557 at Paris) was a French Dominican theologian and Inquisitor.

Life

Entering the Dominican Order at the age of eighteen, he studied in the convent of St-Jacques, Paris, and at the Sorbonne, obtaining the licentiate in theology, 6 February 1527. His reputation for learning and eloquence led to his appointment as grand inquisitor for France (1534), an office which he held until his death.

Compelled to pronounce upon false accusations made against Ignatius Loyola and "The Spiritual", he detected the fraud. Instead of condemning Loyola, he praised and assisted him, and kept for himself a copy of the Exercises. He was indefatigable in preaching, and held several offices in his order. Some writers erroneously call Ory a Spaniard and write his name Ortiz.

Works

The only fully authenticated printed work of Ory is his "Alexipharmacum" (Paris, 1544; Venice, 1551–58). In the second part he uses against the heretics five words of St. Paul, viz. grace, justification, sin, liberty, law (no exclusive reference to 1 Corinthians 14:19). Other works attributed to him are: Opusculum de imaginibus, and Septem scholae contra haereticos, but Jacques Échard does not assign the places or dates of their publication.

References
Quétif and Échard, Scriptores Ord. Praed., II (Paris, 1721), 162;
Sixtus Senensis, Bibliotheca Sancta (Venice, 1566; Lyons, 1591);
Niccolò Orlandini, Historiae Societatis Jesu pars prima, sive Ignatius (Rome, 1615);
Thompson, Saint Ignatius Loyola (London, 1910), 65; in the alphabetical index to this work Ory is called Ortiz.

Attribution

1492 births
1557 deaths
People from Côtes-d'Armor
French Dominicans
16th-century French Catholic theologians
University of Paris alumni